Magazines or Novels is the second studio album by American recording artist Andy Grammer, released on August 5, 2014 through S-Curve Records. It includes the triple-platinum selling hit single "Honey, I'm Good" which peaked at #9 on the Billboard Hot 100. A special edition exclusive to Target stores was released in May 2015 featuring two newly recorded tracks: "Kamikaze" and "Amazing". A re-issued deluxe edition was released on November 20, 2015 with new artwork and included the album's third single, "Good to Be Alive (Hallelujah)".

Singles
Prior to the album's release, Grammer released a single "Back Home" on April 8, 2014, co-written by Grammer and Ryan Met of the band AJR, who co-produced the track with Jon Levine. The album's second single, "Honey, I'm Good" was co-written by Grammer and Nolan Sipe and produced by Sipe, Steve Greenberg and Brian West. Grammer went on the "Siren Songs" tour with Los Angeles-based recording artist Hughie Stone Fish in September 2014.

The second single "Honey, I'm Good" was released in the US in November 2014, and eventually impacted radio in February 2015. It became his biggest single to date, peaking at #9 on the Billboard Hot 100 and being certified triple-platinum by the RIAA.

In August 2015, during his run on Dancing with the Stars, Grammer released a new single "Good to Be Alive (Hallelujah)" (also written by Ryan Met from AJR) which was included on a reissued deluxe version on November 6, 2015.

Critical reception
Judah Joseph from The Huffington Post gave a positive review of the album saying "it is in ways reminiscent of John Mayer's earlier work" and compared Grammer's voice to Gavin DeGraw and Adam Levine's. "Magazines or Novels displays a level of consistent creativity and continued talent. [...] It surpasses the standard he set back in 2011". Joseph concluded describing the album as "emotionally complex collection of songs". Newsday reviewer Glenn Gamboa gave the album a C grade commenting "it feels like a desperate attempt to manufacture another hit" while he ultimately "ends up with cut-rate approximations of other artists (Maroon 5 and OneRepublic)." James Dinh from "SheKnows.com" analyzed the meanings of the songs and its contrasting lyrics and stated that "Grammer sprinkles a variety of lyrical themes throughout Magazines or Novels. While he plays up his lust for women (even though he's married) on the country-pop hoedown "Baby, I'm Good", he switches it up and assumes the role of sweet husband on the retro-sounding "Forever", using his easy-breezy falsetto to sing about how long his girl takes to get ready."

Track listing

Charts

Weekly charts

Year-end charts

Certifications

References

2014 albums
Andy Grammer albums
S-Curve Records albums